55 Cancri d (abbreviated 55 Cnc d), formally named Lipperhey , is an extrasolar planet in a long-period orbit around the Sun-like star 55 Cancri A. Located at a similar distance from its star as Jupiter is from the Sun, it is the fifth and outermost known planet in its planetary system. 55 Cancri d was discovered on June 13, 2002.

Name
In July 2014 the International Astronomical Union launched NameExoWorlds, a process for giving proper names to certain exoplanets and their host stars. The process involved public nomination and voting for the new names. In December 2015, the IAU announced the winning name was Lippershey for this planet. The winning name was submitted by the Royal Netherlands Association for Meteorology and Astronomy of the Netherlands. It honors the spectacle maker and telescope pioneer Hans Lippershey. In January 2016, in recognition that his actual name was Lipperhey (with Lippershey an error introduced in the 19th century), the exoplanet name was corrected to Lipperhey by the IAU and that name was submitted to the official sites that keep track of astronomical information.

Discovery
Like the majority of known extrasolar planets found at the time, 55 Cancri d was detected by observing changes in its star's radial velocity. This was achieved by making sensitive measurements of the Doppler shift of the star's spectrum. At the time of discovery, 55 Cancri A was already known to possess one planet (55 Cancri b), however there was still a drift in the radial velocity measurements which was unaccounted-for.

In 2002, further measurements revealed the presence of a long-period planet in an orbit at around 5 AU from the star. The same measurements also indicated the presence of another inner planet, designated 55 Cancri c.

Orbit and mass

When 55 Cancri d was discovered, it was thought to be on a fairly low eccentricity orbit similar to Jupiter in the Solar System, though the orbital elements were not well determined. As more data were collected, the best-fit solution for this planet turned out to be highly eccentric, more so than any of the planets in the Solar System. In 2008, after a complete orbit of this planet had been observed, the true orbit was revealed, indicating that as had been originally suspected, the planet's 14 year orbit was in fact near-circular, located about 5.77 AU from the star.

A limitation of the radial velocity method used to discover 55 Cancri d is that only a lower limit on the planet's mass can be obtained. In the case of 55 Cancri d, this lower limit was around 3.835 times the mass of Jupiter. In 2004, astrometric measurements with the Fine Guidance Sensors on the Hubble Space Telescope suggest that the planet's orbit is inclined by around 53° with respect to the plane of the sky. If this measurement is confirmed, it implies that the planet's true mass is 25% greater than the lower limit, at around 4.8 Jupiter masses; and that 55 Cancri d is not coplanar with the innermost planets e and b (both at about 85°). This measurement is dependent on the planet's accurate orbital period, estimates for which have changed since 2004.

Characteristics
Given the planet's high mass, the planet is a gas giant with no solid surface. Since the planet has only been detected indirectly, parameters such as its radius, composition, and temperature are unknown.

Assuming a composition similar to that of Jupiter and that the planet's atmosphere is close to chemical equilibrium, it is predicted that 55 Cancri d is covered in a layer of water clouds: the planet's internal heat probably keeps it too warm to form the ammonia-based clouds that are typical of Jupiter. Its surface gravity is likely to be about 4 to 5 times stronger than Jupiter, or about 10 to 15 times that of Earth which is because the radius of the planet is unlikely to be much more than Jupiter's and is probably slightly smaller than Jupiter due to the high metal content in the parent star.

See also
 Appearance of extrasolar planets
 Cancer (Chinese astronomy)
 Lists of exoplanets
 Gliese 1132 b, Rocky exoplanet with a confirmed atmosphere.
 Mu Arae c, At constellation Ara
 Planetary system

References

External links
 

55 Cancri
Cancer (constellation)
Exoplanets discovered in 2002
Giant planets
Exoplanets detected by radial velocity
Exoplanets detected by astrometry
Exoplanets with proper names